The South East Central Railway (abbreviated SECR) is one of the 19 Railway Zones in India. The Zone Office is headquartered at Bilaspur and comprises the Bilaspur, Nagpur and Raipur Division.

History
This Zone was formerly part of the South Eastern Railway. It was inaugurated on 20 September 1998 and dedicated to the nation on 1 April 2003.

Divisions
 Bilaspur railway division
 Raipur railway division
 Nagpur SEC railway division

Infrastructure
Bilaspur Railway Station is a regional hub for the system. It is the busiest junction in Chhattisgarh and the fourth-busiest in Central India. The zone's major stations are Itwari railway station (ITR), Gondia (G),  (BRD), Dongargarh (DGG), Rajnandgaon (RJN), Durg Junction railway station (DURG), Bhilai Power House railway station (BPHB), Bhilai (BIA), Raipur (R), Bhatapara (BYT), Tilda (TLD), Bilaspur (BSP), Gevra Road (GAD), Champa (CPH), Raigarh (RIG), and Anuppur (APR), all of which lie on the Mumbai-Howrah and Mumbai-Katni-Bilaspur main lines. Bilaspur, Gondia, Durg and Raipur are the zone's major junctions. By 2007, SECR had added a third rail line between Durg and Raigarh, And a tender has been passed in October 2019 to add the fourth line between Raigarh and Durg due to the heavy freight contranment.

Loco sheds
 Electric Loco Shed, Bhilai
 Electric Loco Shed, Bilaspur
 Electric & Diesel Loco Shed, Raipur
 Diesel Loco Shed, Motibagh (Nagpur)

See also

 Zones and divisions of Indian Railways
 All India Station Masters' Association (AISMA)

References

External links
 

Zones of Indian Railways
 
2003 establishments in India